The Des Moines-class cruisers were a trio of very large U.S. Navy heavy cruisers commissioned in 1948 and 1949. They were the last of the all-gun heavy cruisers, exceeded in size in the American navy only by the  s that straddled the line between heavy cruiser and battlecruiser.

Description
Derived from the  heavy cruisers, they were larger, had an improved machinery layout and carried a new design of auto-loading, rapid-fire 8"/55 gun (the Mk16). The improved Mk16 guns of the main battery were the first auto-loading 8" guns fielded by the US Navy and allowed a much higher rate of fire than earlier designs, capable of sustaining eight shots per minute per barrel, about twice that previous heavy cruisers could. The auto-loading mechanism could function at any elevation, giving some anti-aircraft capability.

History

Their speed made them valuable to escort carrier groups and they were useful in showing the flag in goodwill visits. The first two were decommissioned in 1961 and 1959, respectively, but Newport News remained in commission until 1975, serving for a long period (1962–1968) as United States Second Fleet flagship, and providing valuable gunfire support off Vietnam from 1967 to 1973.  The ship's missions included shelling targets close to the North Vietnam shoreline. In August 1972 she raided Haiphong harbor at night with other US Navy ships to shell coastal defenses, Surface-to-air missile sites and Cat Bi airfield.

Newport News was the last active all-gun cruiser (serving 25.5 years continuously) and the first completely air-conditioned surface ship in the U.S. Navy.  Salem is a museum ship in Quincy, Massachusetts. Newport News was laid up at the Philadelphia Naval Shipyard and scrapped in 1993, and Des Moines was scrapped in 2006–2007.  Dallas (CA-140) and eight other ships (CA-141 through CA-143 and CA-149 through CA-153) were canceled at the end of World War II.

Ships in class

Gallery

See also
 List of cruisers of the United States Navy

References

Bibliography

External links

Des Moines class cruiser—NavSource Online
Des Moines class cruiser—GlobalSecurity.org
Des Moines class cruiser—National Park Service

Cruiser classes